5F-JWH-398 (4'-chloro-AM-2201, Cl-2201, CLAM, SGT-20) is a recreational designer drug which is classed as a synthetic cannabinoid. It is from the naphthoylindole family, and produces cannabis-like effects. It was legally sold in New Zealand from 2012-2014 under the psychoactive substances scheme but was discontinued in May 2014 following the end of the interim approval period under the Psychoactive Substances Act 2013. Subsequently it has appeared on the illicit market around the world and was identified in Germany in May 2019.

See also 
 AM-2201
 JWH-398
 MAM-2201

References 

Naphthoylindoles
Organofluorides
Designer drugs
CB1 receptor agonists
CB2 receptor agonists
Chloroarenes